Sanasta miestä is the fifth and final studio album by a Finnish singer-songwriter Aki Sirkesalo. Released posthumously by Sony Music Entertainment on 30 November 2005, the album peaked at number one on the Finnish Albums Chart.

Track listing

Chart performance

References

2005 albums
Aki Sirkesalo albums
Sony Music albums